Georg Christian, Prince of Lobkowicz (14 May 1835 - 22 December 1908) was a member of the old Bohemian aristocratic family of Lobkowicz and an influential politician of late 19th century Bohemia and Austria-Hungary. He was a Prince (Fürst) of Lobkowicz.

Born in Vienna as a son of August, Prince of Lobkowicz, and his wife Sidonia, née Countess Kinsky, he was one of the political leaders of the conservative Bohemian nobility. He was a member of the Bohemian Diet from 1865 - 1872 and 1883 - 1907 (presiding over it from 1871 - 1872 and 1883 - 1907 as Land Marshal of Bohemia). He served as deputy in the Abgeordnetenhaus of the Austrian Parliament (Reichsrat) in 1879 - 1883 and became a hereditary member of the Herrenhaus in 1883. In 1871, he was involved in negotiations concerning the relationship between Bohemia and Austria.

He married Princess Anna Maria von und zu Liechtenstein, of the House of Liechtenstein, in Vienna on 22 May 1864, by whom he had 12 children. He died in Prague.

Descendants
His daughter, Marie, Princess of Lobkowicz, married Karl, Count of Eltz, the grandfather of Christiane, Countess of Eltz, the mother of Karl-Theodor zu Guttenberg.

Orders and decorations
 :
 Grand Cross of the Imperial Order of Leopold, 1891
 Knight of the Golden Fleece, 1903
 Grand Cross of St. Stephen, 1905
 : Knight of Honour and Devotion

Ancestry

References

1835 births
1908 deaths
Politicians from Vienna
Jiri Kristian
Austrian princes
Old Czech Party politicians
Members of the Austrian House of Deputies (1873–1879)
Members of the Austrian House of Deputies (1879–1885)
Members of the House of Lords (Austria)
Knights of the Golden Fleece of Austria
Grand Crosses of the Order of Saint Stephen of Hungary
Knights of Malta